Georgioupoli is a resort village and former municipality in the Chania regional unit, Crete, Greece.
Since the 2011 local government reform it is part of the municipality Apokoronas, of which it is a municipal unit. It was named after Prince George of Greece, high commissioner of the island in the last years of Ottoman occupation.

Geography
Three rivers meet the sea at the village; the largest, Almiros, creates a small harbour for fishing and tourist boats. The entrance to the village on the old road from Vrisses is a long avenue of eucalyptus trees.

Formerly a small fishing village, Georgioupolis is very much a tourist town now, with many cafés, tavernas and small hotels and apartment blocks. The town square is surrounded by outdoor seating used by tourists enjoying their drinks and ice creams. The  beach is the main attraction of the area, with Kalyvaki beach on the other side of the river as well. Nearby Lake Kournas is also a popular excursion by foot, bicycle or tourist 'train'. Georgioupolis is a well-located base for exploring the traditional villages of the area towards Vamos or into the White Mountains to the south.

Archaeological evidence points to Georgioupoli as the site of ancient Amphimalla (Amfimala or Amfimalion), the port of Lappa, a classical city at modern Argyroupoli.

Municipal unit
Georgioupolis, with 513 residents at the 2001 census, is the largest village of the municipal unit of the same name, covering several other villages inland as far as Kournas. The town hall of Georgioupoli municipality is at Kavros-Kournas. The mayor until 2006 was Georgios Papadakis. Ferdinandos Marikakis was elected as mayor on 15 October 2006. The office was renamed "Deputy Mayor" at the 2010 elections, at which time the office was won by Iosifis (Joseph) "Sifi" Stavroulakis. Since August 2012, he has also held responsibility for all sewerage works in the Apokoronas region.

In 2010 the new Kalikratis plan was introduced, bringing all municipalities in Apokoronas, including Georgioupoli, together. On 14 November 2010 Grigoris Markakis was elected mayor of Apokoronas, at the head of the DEKA party, winning after the second round of voting.

Historical population

Notable residents
 Priest Demetrios of Agioi Isidoroi Church Athens: from Argyromouri, Exopoli

International relations

Twin towns – Sister cities
Georgioupoli is twinned with:
 - Kärdla, Hiiumaa, Estonia

See also
List of settlements in the Chania regional unit

References

External links
Greek Travel Pages (Village)
Greek Travel Pages (Municipality)

Populated places in Chania (regional unit)